Dorothy Frooks (February 12, 1896 – April 13, 1997) was an American writer, publisher, military officer, lawyer, and suffragist. She also ran for Congress twice, in 1920 as a member of the Prohibition Party and in 1934 on the Law Preservation ticket for New York's At-large congressional district.

She worked as a writer for the New York Evening World and published the Murray Hill News in 1952. She also wrote Labor Courts Outlaw Strikes, a pamphlet calling for the establishment of a labor court.

A lawyer in Peekskill, New York, she wrote numerous fiction and nonfiction books, including The Olympic Torch, The American Heart, and an autobiography, Lady Lawyer.

Life and law career 
Dorothy was born on February 12, 1896, on a farm near Saugerties, New York. She was one of ten children of Reginald Frooks, a successful businessman, and Rosita Siberz, an international socialite. She and her siblings were raised on a  farm in the Hudson Valley, and spent their winters in the Waldorf Hotel.

She was recruited by her mother's London society friends to give street-corner speeches at the age of 11.

Frooks graduated from Hamilton Law School in Chicago and received her master's degree from New York University. By the early 1920s she was the first full-time lawyer for the Salvation Army.

Military career
Frooks served as chief yeoman in the United States Navy during World War I and as a judge advocate in the United States Army during World War II.

She served as the National Commander of the Women World War Veterans and worked with the Veterans of World War I and the Retreads, an organization for veterans who served in both world wars.

Reds
Frooks appeared as one of the "Witnesses" in Warren Beatty's 1981 film Reds, along with fellow centenarian radicals Scott Nearing and George Seldes. Frooks, Nearing and Seldes were all firsthand witnesses of the red-baiting, McCarthyism, and Cold War hysteria of the 1950s.

Death
Frooks died in 1997, at the age of 101, and was interred in Calverton National Cemetery.

References

External links

Dorothy Frooks Papers at the New-York Historical Society

1896 births
1997 deaths
American centenarians
American women journalists
American pamphleteers
Law Preservation Party politicians
20th-century American actresses
People from Saugerties, New York
Journalists from New York (state)
American suffragists
Activists from New York (state)
United States Army personnel of World War II
American women in World War II
Women in the United States Army
American military lawyers
United States Army Judge Advocate General's Corps
Burials at Calverton National Cemetery
Women centenarians
Yeoman (F) personnel
20th-century American journalists